Symbols of Latvia are items or symbols that have symbolic meaning to, or represent, Latvia. These symbols are seen in official capacities, such as flags, coats of arms, postage stamps, and currency, and in URLs. They appear less formally as recurring themes in  literature, art and folk art, heraldry, monuments, clothing, personal decoration, and as the names of parks, bridges, streets, and clubs. The less formal manifestations may be classified as national emblems.

During the occupation of Latvia by the Soviet Union and briefly by Nazi Germany during World War II, the anthem, coat of arms and flag were prohibited from display and the Soviet versions of the flag, coat of arms and the anthem were used during its rule as a Soviet republic. All national symbols of Latvia were reinstated in 1990 before Latvia restored its independence a year later which are considered the continuation of the Latvian state before its occupation in 1940. The public display of the Nazi swastika and the Soviet hammer and sickle along with other symbols associated with them are now banned in Latvia in 2014.

Official symbols

Flag

The national flag of Latvia is a carmine red field with a narrow white stripe in the middle, the flag was created in 1917 based on a 13th century legend from the Rhymed Chronicle of Livonia that a Latgalian leader was wounded in battle, and the edges of the white sheet in which he was wrapped were stained by his blood with the centre stripe of the flag being left unstained. It was officially adopted in 1921 but suppressed after the country was occupied by the Soviet Union in 1940, and officially restored in 1990.

Coat of arms

The coat of arms of Latvia is based on new symbols for the nation's freedom and elements from coats of arms of Polish and Swedish Livonia and the Duchy of Courland and Semigallia, it was adopted in 1921 along with the national flag, also banned in Soviet era until the restoration in 1990.

National Anthem

Dievs, svētī Latviju! is the national anthem of Latvia. It was initially created in 1873 as a patriotic song, and in 1920 became the national anthem.

Other symbols
Besides the three official symbols, there are some other objects in Latvia which have the symbolic value for national identity, including the national flower ox-eye daisy, the national tree small-leaved linden and European oak, the national mineral amber, Freedom Monument as the symbol of Latvian independence, national festival Jāņi.